The Toyota Isis is a seven-seat large MPV manufactured by Kanto Auto Works under contract for Japanese automaker Toyota. It is sold in Japan and was launched in September 2004. It features sliding doors and is available with either front- or four-wheel drive and straight-4 1.8- and 2.0-liter gasoline engines. It competed in Japan with the Honda Stream and the Nissan Lafesta.

The Isis used a unique approach to the sliding doors in that the front passenger door and the rear passenger sliding door interlock when closed, instead of having a doorjamb that the doors attach to. This door system is used only on the passenger side. The doors on the driver's side attach with a conventional doorjamb. The front passenger seat can be folded flat upon itself and then tilted forward to further provide passenger access. The doors also interlock with the top and bottom door openings so that both doors can be opened independently of each other. This door feature was first used by Toyota on the Toyota Raum. This type of door was first used on the Nissan Prairie in 1981, and was also used on the Ford B-Max.

For model year 2007 on Japanese models only, G-BOOK, a subscription telematics service was offered as an option.

When the terrorist group ISIS emerged in 2014, Toyota was criticized for inadvertently supplying the militant group with trucks, and was urged to change the name of the MPV, which had become unfortunate by then. The Isis was discontinued in Japan on 11 December 2017.

Trim levels (Japan) 
2000 cc 
 Platana (2WD, 4WD)
 G U-Selection (2WD, 4WD)
 G (2WD, 4WD)
 L (2WD, 4WD)
 L X-Selection (2WD, 4WD)
 Navi Special
 Navi Selection Blanc
 Navi Selection Noir

1800 cc 
 Platana (2WD)
 L (2WD)
 L X-Selection (2WD)
 Navi Special
 Navi Selection Blanc
 Navi Selection Noir

References 

Isis
All-wheel-drive vehicles
Cars introduced in 2004
Front-wheel-drive vehicles
Minivans
Vehicles with CVT transmission
2010s cars